Hayward is an unincorporated community located on Oklahoma State Highway 164 in Garfield County, Oklahoma, United States. It is located on the Black Bear-Red Rock Watershed.

References

Unincorporated communities in Garfield County, Oklahoma
Unincorporated communities in Oklahoma

vo:Bison (Oklahoma)